Obaidul Hassan is a judge on the Appellate Division of Bangladesh Supreme Court.

Early life 
Hassan was born on 11 January 1959 in Mohanganj Upazila, Netrokona District, East Pakistan, Pakistan. Hassan's father was Akhlakul Hossain Ahmed, a member of East Pakistan Provincial Assembly, and his mother was Begum Hosne Ara Hossain. His brother, Sajjadul Hassan, is the chairperson of Bangladesh Biman. Hassan completed his undergraduate and graduate degree in Economics from the University of Dhaka. He completed his law degree from the University of Dhaka.

Career 

In 1986, Hassan started working as a lawyers in the District Court and the High Court in 1988.

Hassan started working as a advocate in the Appellate Division of Bangladesh Supreme Court in 2005. In 2009, he was appointed an additional judge of Bangladesh High Court and became a full judge in 2011.

On 2 September 2020, Hassan was appointed to the Appellate Division of Bangladesh Supreme Court.

In 2017, Justice Obaidul Hasan served as a member of a five-member search committee headed by the then Appellate Division Justice Syed Mahmud Hossain.Later, in 2022, President Abdul Hamid formed a search committee with Justice Obaidul Hasan as its chairman.

Hassan was appointed to the International Crimes Tribunal-2 on 25 March 2012. Hassan was made the chairperson of the International Crimes Tribunal-2 on 13 December 2012.On 29 July 2021, Hassan was nominated by Chief Justice Syed Mahmud Hossain as the chamber judge of Bangladesh Supreme Court to reduce backlog of cases  at the court through virtual heading during the COVID-19 pandemic in Bangladesh.

References 

Living people
20th-century Bangladeshi lawyers
Supreme Court of Bangladesh justices
University of Dhaka alumni
21st-century Bangladeshi judges
1959 births
People from Netrokona District